Rainbow Canyon may refer to:

Places
Rainbow Canyon (Nevada), a canyon located in Lincoln County, Nevada
Rainbow Canyon (California), a canyon near the western edge of Death Valley National Park in Inyo County, California
Rainbow Canyon (British Columbia), a small canyon on the Moose River
Rainbow Canyon Rehabilitation Center